The Trinity Group is a group (sequence of rock strata) in the Lower Cretaceous lithostratigraphy of Texas, Arkansas, Mississippi, Louisiana and Oklahoma. It is named for the Trinity River of Texas.

A stratigraphic column at the Mount Bonnell Fault location starts with the Lower Cretaceous Trinity Group overlain by the Edwards Group.  Upper Cretaceous formations follow, starting with the Del Rio Clay, Buda Limestone, and then the Eagle Ford Group.  Formations within the Trinity Group include the Hammett Formation, Cow Creek Formation, Hensel Formation, and Lower and Upper Glen Rose Formation.  The Hammett and the lower portion of the Upper Glen Rose act as confining units (or aquitard) for the Middle Trinity Aquifer.  The Upper Glen Rose contains the Upper Trinity Aquifer, which appears to have intra-aquifer groundwater flow with the Edwards Aquifer as water levels are at the same elevation.

Vertebrate fauna

Crocodylomorphs

Dinosaurs

Pterosaurs

References 

Cretaceous Arkansas
Lower Cretaceous Series of North America
Aptian Stage
Geologic groups of Texas
Natural history of Texas
Geologic groups of Arkansas
Geologic groups of Mississippi
Geologic groups of Louisiana 
Geologic groups of Oklahoma